Bertalan Tóth (born 10 November 1975) is a Hungarian lawyer and politician. He served as leader of the Hungarian Socialist Party from 2018 to 2022, following Gyula Molnár's resignation.

References 

Living people
1975 births
Socialist politicians
Hungarian socialists
Members of the National Assembly of Hungary (2014–2018)
Members of the National Assembly of Hungary (2018–2022)
Members of the National Assembly of Hungary (2022–2026)
Hungarian Socialist Party politicians
People from Pécs